The 1981–82 Arkansas Razorbacks men's basketball team represented the University of Arkansas during the 1981–82 NCAA Division I men's basketball season. The head coach was Eddie Sutton, serving for his eighth year. The team played its home games in Barnhill Arena in Fayetteville, Arkansas. This team finished second in the SWC regular season standings, and lost in the semifinals of the conference tournament. In the 1982 NCAA Tournament, the Hogs were defeated by Kansas State in the round of 32.

Roster

Schedule and results

|-
!colspan=9 style=| Regular Season

|-
!colspan=9 style=| SWC Tournament

|-
!colspan=9 style=| NCAA Tournament

Rankings

1982 NBA Draft

References

Arkansas Razorbacks men's basketball seasons
Arkansas
Arkansas
1981 in sports in Arkansas
1982 in sports in Arkansas